Isaac "Bud" Stallworth (born January 18, 1950) is a retired American basketball player. He was a 6'5" (1.96 m) and 190 lb (86 kg) shooting guard and played college basketball at the University of Kansas (KU) where he was named 1972 All-Big Eight Player of the Year. He had a professional career in the NBA from 1972–1977.

Stallworth was selected 7th overall by the Seattle SuperSonics in the 1972 NBA draft, and by the Denver Rockets in the 1972 ABA Draft. After two seasons with the Sonics, he was made available in the 1974 expansion draft to be selected by the New Orleans Jazz, for whom he played for three seasons. His playing career was cut short due to a back injury sustained in an automobile accident in 1977. In 1972 while at KU, Stallworth scored 50 points in a win against Missouri.

In 1978, Stallworth graduated from KU with a bachelor of social work degree.

Notes

External links
NBA stats @ basketballreference.com
 One on One - Isaac "Bud" Stallworth (Part 1 of 2), nbrpa.com – posted January 17, 2006

1950 births
Living people
African-American basketball players
All-American college men's basketball players
American men's basketball players
Basketball players from Alabama
Kansas City Sizzlers players
Kansas Jayhawks men's basketball players
New Orleans Jazz players
People from Hartselle, Alabama
Seattle SuperSonics draft picks
Seattle SuperSonics players
Shooting guards
Small forwards
21st-century African-American people
20th-century African-American sportspeople